The Waynesville Main Street Historic District in Waynesville, Ohio is a  historic district that was listed on the National Register of Historic Places in 2002.  It runs for about five blocks along Main Street from just below South Street in the south to Franklin Road in the north.

In 2002, it included 98 buildings deemed to contribute to the historic character of the area and 35 non-contributing resources.

Selected buildings are:
Mahlon Bateman House, 38 S. Main St. (1847), is the most important Greek Revival building
Thomas Swift House, 243 High Street (c.1820), a five-bay brick I-house with Federal style
Waynesville Academy, 185 N. Main St. (1844)

References

Houses on the National Register of Historic Places in Ohio
Queen Anne architecture in Ohio
Italianate architecture in Ohio
National Register of Historic Places in Warren County, Ohio
Houses in Warren County, Ohio
Historic districts on the National Register of Historic Places in Ohio